Kenton '76 is one of the last two studio albums by American jazz musician Stan Kenton and his orchestra, released in 1976, by Creative World Records. Recording sessions for the album took place in Chicago on December 3–5, 1975.  The album was recorded after the longest hiatus the band would have from the studio due to financial difficulties and Kenton's growing health problems.

Background

The take of Decoupage on the album is third try taken Dec 4; 10 takes of this Levy masterpiece are done over 2 days. Though the piece is one of the highlights for the band during that era, the solo by Terry Lane is weak and pointed out in later notes by Bob Curnow, "Stan did not hire most of the guys, Dick (Shearer) did.  With some obvious exceptions, I don't believe the soloists in the 70's bands were the equal of the earlier bands."  Samba De Haps is the first of several works  written by Mark Taylor the Kenton band record for the last two studio albums, he would create a distinctive signature and a name that is well known in the publishing world.

Bob Curnow gives great credit to Hank Levy, "Time For A Change was a fantastic chart, the way it's put together, and the way the band swings within the meter. I don't mean swings necessarily in the traditional sense, but the way they play rhythmically, I think it's a hell of a chart.   And if listen to the end of a Pat Metheny pieces called "Every Summer Night", it closes literally with the first four measures of 'Decoupage'." Curnow also comments on Kenton's health issues during that time, "Stan conducted the band through Holman's 'Tiburon'...Stan was wasn't so quick to come to grips musically with what was happening.  I was in the booth, and he was conducting, and it was a real struggle."

Reception

Track listing

Send In The Clowns and My Funny Valentine arranged by Dave Barduhn.

Personnel

Musicians
piano and leader: Stan Kenton
saxophones and flutes: Alan Yankee, Dan Salmasian, Greg Smith, Roy Reynolds, Terry Layne
trumpets:  John Harner, Jay Sollenberger, Jim Oatts, Steve Campos, Tim Hagans
trombones: Dick Shearer, Dave Keim, Mike Egan, Alan Morrisey (bass trombone), Douglas Purviance (bass trombone, tuba)
acoustic and electric bass: Dave Stone
drum set: Gary Hobbs
percussion: Ramon Lopez

Production
Bob Curnow – production
Murray Allen – recording engineering
Jordana Von Spiro – art direction
Serge Seymour, Audree Coke, Jurgen Wiechmann – cover art/photography

References

Bibliography

External links
 
 Kenton '76 at Allmusic
 Kenton '76 at All Things Kenton

Instrumental albums
1976 albums
Stan Kenton albums
GNP Crescendo Records albums